The 1993 All-Ireland Junior Hurling Championship was the 63rd staging of the All-Ireland Junior Championship, the Gaelic Athletic Association's second tier Gaelic football championship.

Wexford entered the championship as the defending champions, however, they were beaten in the Leinster Championship.

The All-Ireland final was played on 25 July 1993 at Leahy Park in Cashel, between Cork and Laois, in what was their first ever meeting in the final. Cork won the match by 0–11 to 2–03 to claim their 10th championship title overall and a first title since 1990.

Results

All-Ireland Junior Football Championship

All-Ireland semi-final

All-Ireland final

References

Junior
All-Ireland Junior Football Championship